Acheux—Franleu station (French: Gare d'Archeux—Franleu) is a former railway station in Chépy and near Acheux-en-Vimeu and Franleu, Hauts-de-France, France. The station opened in 1873 and is located on the Abbeville-Eu railway. The station was served by TER (local) services between Abbeville and Le Tréport operated by SNCF. Train services were discontinued in 2018.

References

Railway stations in France opened in 1873
Defunct railway stations in Somme (department)